The 1964 New Mexico gubernatorial election took place on November 3, 1964, in order to elect the Governor of New Mexico. Incumbent Democrat Jack M. Campbell ran for reelection to a second term.

Democratic primary

Republican primary

General election

Results

References

1964
gubernatorial
New Mexico
November 1964 events in the United States